The Ultimate Edition is a limited edition 50-disc CD box set released by Klaus Schulze in 2000 collecting his previous limited edition multi-disc box sets Silver Edition (1993, 10 discs), Historic Edition (1995, 10 discs), and Jubilee Edition (1997, 25 discs), which contain unreleased archival recordings in addition to new studio material. A further five discs were added for this release. Several discs were altered and restructured from their original versions: discs 7 and 8 were extended by five minutes; discs 11, 13, 14, and 22 were slightly remastered; and discs 41 and 42 were restructured. Two tracks from Jubilee Edition were omitted ("The Unspoken Thing" from Disc 19 and "Ludwigs Traum" from Disc 21). The discs are divided into five boxes of ten discs, housed in individual cardboard sleeves. Between 2009 and 2015, tracks from this set were reissued as La Vie Electronique, a series of multi-disc CD sets releasing all the material of The Ultimate Edition in chronological order.

Track listing
All tracks composed by Klaus Schulze.

Box 1
Disc 1: Film Musik (Disc 1 of Silver Edition)

Disc 2: Narren des Schicksals (Disc 2 of Silver Edition)

Disc 3: Was War Vor der Zeit (Disc 3 of Silver Edition)

Disc 4: Sense of Beauty (Disc 4 of Silver Edition)

Disc 5: Picasso Geht Spazieren (Disc 5 of Silver Edition)

Disc 6: Picasso Geht Spazieren (Continued) (Disc 6 of Silver Edition)

Disc 7: The Music Box (Disc 7 of Silver Edition)

Disc 8: Machine de Plaisir (Disc 8 of Silver Edition)

Disc 9: Life in Ecstasy (Disc 9 of Silver Edition)

Disc 10: Mysterious Tapes (Disc 10 of Silver Edition)

Box 2
Disc 11: Zeitgeist (Disc 1 of Historic Edition)

Disc 12: I Sing the Body Electric (Disc 2 of Historic Edition)

Disc 13: Alles ist Gut (Disc 3 of Historic Edition)

Disc 14: The Future (Disc 4 of Historic Edition)

Disc 15: Leiden mit Manu (Disc 5 of Historic Edition)

Disc 16: The Andromeda Strain (Disc 6 of Historic Edition)

Disc 17: My Virtual Principles (Disc 7 of Historic Edition)

Disc 18: The Poet (Disc 8 of Historic Edition)

Disc 19: Schwanensee (Disc 9 of Historic Edition)

Disc 20: Der Lauf der Dinge (Disc 10 of Historic Edition)

Box 3
Disc 21: Tradition & Vision (Disc 1 of Jubilee Edition)

Disc 22: Avec Arthur (Disc 2 of Jubilee Edition)

Disc 23: Budapest (Disc 3 of Jubilee Edition)

Disc 24: Borrowed Time (Disc 4 of Jubilee Edition)

Disc 25: Opera Trance (Disc 5 of Jubilee Edition)

Disc 26: Real Colours (Disc 6 of Jubilee Edition)

Disc 27: Cyborgs Faust (Disc 7 of Jubilee Edition)

Disc 28: Vie de Rêve (Disc 8 of Jubilee Edition)

Disc 29: Der Welt Lauf (Disc 9 of Jubilee Edition)

Disc 30: Die Kunst... (Disc 10 of Jubilee Edition)

Box 4
Disc 31: Olé! (Disc 11 of Jubilee Edition)

Disc 32: Titanensee (Disc 12 of Jubilee Edition)

Disc 33: Angry Moog (Disc 13 of Jubilee Edition)

Disc 34: Die Erde ist Rund (Disc 14 of Jubilee Edition)

Disc 35: Deutsch (Disc 15 of Jubilee Edition)

Disc 36: Unplugged (Disc 16 of Jubilee Edition)

Disc 37: Mostly Bruxelles (Disc 17 of Jubilee Edition)

Disc 38: À la Mode? (Disc 18 of Jubilee Edition)

Disc 39: Interessant (Disc 20 of Jubilee Edition)

Disc 40: Stahlsinfonie (Disc 24 of Jubilee Edition)

Box 5
Disc 41: Walk the Edge

Disc 42: New Style 

Disc 43: Höchamtliche Sounds (Disc 22 of Jubilee Edition)

Disc 44: Planetarium London (Disc 23 of Jubilee Edition)

Disc 45: 'Nuff Said!  (Disc 25 of Jubilee Edition)

Disc 46: Bologna

Disc 47: Discoveries

Disc 48: From the Attic

Disc 49: The Cello

Disc 50: Lone Tracks

Trailer

Prior to the release of The Ultimate Edition a compilation album was made available in 1999, containing excerpts from the set, as well as three exclusive tracks, one of which ("In Cosa Crede Chi Non Crede?"), while appearing here as an excerpt, was later reissued complete on Mirage in 2005, and another ("Man at Work"), was later reissued on La Vie Electronique 14 in 2014.

See also
Contemporary Works I
Contemporary Works II

References

External links
 The Ultimate Edition at the official site of Klaus Schulze
 
 

Klaus Schulze albums